Royal Flush may refer to:

Card games
Royal flush (poker hand), an ace-high straight flush
Royal Flush (game), a solitaire card game

Music
Royal Flush (rapper) (Ramel Govantes, born 1977), an American rapper
Royal Flush (album), a 1962 album by jazz trumpeter Donald Byrd
"Royal Flush" (song), a 2008 song by OutKast's Big Boi
Royal Flush, a 2010 mixtape by Cyhi the Prynce

Other uses
Royal Flush (magazine), American humor magazine
"Royal Flush" (Monkees episode), the first episode of The Monkees
, Royal Flush (novel), a 1932 novel by Margaret Irwin
"A Royal Flush", an Only Fools and Horses Christmas TV special
Operation Royal Flush, a military deception in Second World War

See also

Royal Flush Gang, fictional characters from DC comics